Blastobasis semilutea is a moth in the family Blastobasidae. It was described by Edward Meyrick in 1916. It is found in southern India.

References

Blastobasis
Moths described in 1916